Incentive theory may refer to:

 Organizational behavior#Organization structures and dynamics, a concept of human resources or management theory
 Motivation#Incentive theory, a motivational theory